The Long March 3, also known as the Changzheng 3, CZ-3 and LM-3, was a Chinese orbital carrier rocket design. They were all launched from Launch Area 3 at the Xichang Satellite Launch Center. It was a three-stage rocket, and was mostly used to place DFH-2-class communications satellites into geosynchronous transfer orbits. It was complemented and later replaced by the more powerful Long March 3A, which has an improved third stage.

List of launches

Launch failures

Dong Fang Hong 2 launch failure 
On January 29, 1984, a LM-3 rocket failed during launch.
The third stage failed 4 s after restart for GTO insertion of the satellite, due to incorrect mixture ratio in the engine gas generator, which caused high temperatures and burned out the turbine casing. However, many planned tests on the experimental communications spacecraft were still carried out in the resulting elliptical orbit.

ChinaSat 4 launch failure 
On December 28, 1991, a LM-3 rocket failed during launch.
The third-stage engine suffered a loss of turbine speed and combustion pressure 58 s after re-igniting for the second burn for GTO insertion and shut down completely 135 s after re-ignition. Loss of pressure in the high-pressure helium supply used for engine control had reduced the propellant flow.

ChinaSat 7 launch failure 
On August 18, 1996 a LM-3 rocket failed during launch.
The third-stage engine shut down roughly 40 s earlier than planned because of a fire in the LH2 injector of the gas generator. Insufficient purging had permitted oxygen to freeze in the gas generator during flight.

Specifications

Launch history 
The following launch statistics are gathered from the individual Wikipedia pages of each CZ-3x variants as those pages are updated more frequently by various editors; the numbers are current as of 23 February, 2023.

References

Long March (rocket family)
Vehicles introduced in 1984